The Voice of Poland (season 6) began airing 5 September 2015 on TVP 2. It aired on Saturdays at 20:05 and 21:10.

Tomson & Baron and Edyta Górniak are coaches for the sixth edition. By contrast, Maria Sadowska and Andrzej Piaseczny replace Justyna Steczkowska and Marek Piekarczyk who resigned as judges for professional reasons. Tomasz Kammel and Maciej Musiał return as hosts to the sixth edition. Halina Mlynkova replaced Magdalena Mielcarz who resigned for professional reasons.

Coaches

Tomson & Baron and Edyta Górniak return as coaches for the 6th edition. By contrast, Maria Sadowska and Andrzej Piaseczny replace the role of jurors Justyna Steczkowska and Marek Piekarczyk, who resigned from the post of judges in a professional capacity. Moderators Tomasz Kammel and Maciej Musiał are joined by Halina Mlynkova, who replaced Magdalena Mielcarz. Remigiusz Jakub Wierzgoń a.k.a. "ReZigiusz" joins the "V-reporter" Marta Siurnik to tour the world of the Internet and look behind the scenes at "The Voice of Poland".

Teams
Color key

Blind auditions

Color keys

Episode 1 (September 5, 2015)

Episode 2 (September 5, 2015)

Episode 3 (September 12, 2015)

Episode 4 (September 12, 2015)

Episode 5 (September 19, 2015)

Episode 6 (September 19, 2015)

Episode 7 (September 26, 2015)

Episode 8 (September 26, 2015)

Episode 9 (October 3, 2015)

Episode 10 (October 3, 2015)

The Battle Rounds

Color keys

Episode 14 (October 31, 2015)
Knockouts took place on 31 October 2015.

Color keys

Live Shows

Color keys

Episode 15 (November 7, 2015)

Episode 16 (November 14, 2015)

Episode 17 - Semifinal (November 21, 2015)

Episode 18 - Final (November 28, 2015)

Result details

Results summary of live shows
Color keys
Artist's info

Result details

References

The Voice of Poland
2015 Polish television seasons